Vijay Shekhar Sharma (born 7 June 1978) is an Indian technology entrepreneur and billionaire businessman. He is the Chairman, Managing Director and CEO of One97 Communications and its consumer brand Paytm. He founded Paytm in 2010.

In January 2022, the ICANN-supported Universal Acceptance Steering Group appointed him as UA Ambassador in India. As of September 2022, he had a net worth of US$1.1 billion according to Forbes.

Early life and education 
Vijay Shekhar Sharma was born in Aligarh, Uttar Pradesh on 15 July 1978, the third of the four children of Sulom Prakash, a school teacher, and Asha Sharma, a homemaker. He did his schooling from Harduaganj, a small town near Aligarh. He was a child prodigy, beginning his college life at the age of 15 and graduating as an engineer with a B.Tech degree from the Delhi College of Engineering (now Delhi Technological University) when he was 19 years old

Career 
In 1997, while in college, he started the website indiasite.net, and sold it two years later for US$1 million. Three years later, in 2000, he started One97 Communications  which offered mobile content including news, cricket scores, ringtones, jokes and exam results. One97 Communications Limited is the parent company of Paytm, a digital payments and financial services company which was launched by Sharma in 2010.  In November 2021, Paytm went public raising $2.5 billion at a valuation of $19 billion, making it India's largest initial public offering at that time.

Sharma is also an angel investor who has supported tech startups.

Awards and recognition
	Won the Best Serial Entrepreneur Award  at the Rural and Urban Development Summit and Awards 2022 presented by the Minister of State for Ministry of Housing and Urban Affairs, Government of India.
	Ranked the Youngest Indian Billionaire  by Forbes magazine 
	In 2018, he was named the Entrepreneur of the Year  by AIMA 
	Time Magazine's 100 most influential people in 2017.
	ET Entrepreneur of the Year, by The Economic Times in 2016 
	Ranked by GQ in their listing of the 50 most influential young Indians of 2017.
	In 2017, he became the Dataquest IT Man of the year.
	Received an Honorary doctorate from Amity University, Gurgaon, in 2016
	Honored with the Yash Bharati, the highest state civilian award of the Government of Uttar Pradesh in 2016.
	Named as the Businessman of the Year at GQ Men of the Year Awards 2016.
	He was conferred with the NDTV Indian of the Year in 2016.
	Awarded the Impact Person of the Year Award in 2016. 
	Named India's Hottest Business Leader under 40 by The Economic Times in 2015.
	In September 2015, he was named CEO of the Year by SABRE Award.

Personal life
He is married to Mridula Parashar Sharma and they have a child. His father was a school teacher. He cites Alibaba's founder Jack Ma and Masayoshi Son of Softbank, as his inspirations. In February 2022, Sharma was arrested by Delhi police for hitting his car into the car of a police officer. He was later released on bail.

Other work 
Sharma has been named as the UN Environment's 'Patron for Clean Air', where he helps to drive environmental action and awareness, and advocate for the goals of United Nations Environment's global Breathe Life campaign.

See also

 List of Indian entrepreneurs
 List of Internet entrepreneurs

References 

Businesspeople from Uttar Pradesh
Living people
1978 births
Delhi Technological University alumni
Indian billionaires
Indian company founders